The Hampton Masonic Lodge Building in Hampton, Arkansas is an Early Commercial style building that was built in 1920.  As originally designed the building had commercial store space on the first floor, and rooms for both the Hampton Masonic Lodge and the Farmers Home Administration on the second floor.  In 1954, the building was acquired by the Western Auto Store, and the second floor was turned into a toy department.
It was listed on the National Register of Historic Places in 2008.

References

Clubhouses on the National Register of Historic Places in Arkansas
Former Masonic buildings in Arkansas
Masonic buildings completed in 1920
National Register of Historic Places in Calhoun County, Arkansas
1920 establishments in Arkansas
Masonic Lodge Building